Town & Country was an American minimalist quartet based in Chicago.

Members were:
Ben Vida: Guitar/Trumpet (also member of Pillow and Terminal 4, currently performing solo as Bird Show and also in the Drag City band Singer (band))
Josh Abrams: Double bass/Piano
Liz Payne: Double bass (also member of Pillow)
Jim Dorling: Harmonium

The four members of Town and Country continue to work together in DRMWPN ("Dreamweapon"), a Chicago-based large improvising drone ensemble with a varying cast of performers.

Discography

Albums

Town & Country - 1998 - Box Media
It All Has to Do With It - 2000 - Thrill Jockey
C'mon - 2002 - Thrill Jockey
5 - 2003 - Thrill Jockey
Up Above - 2006 - Thrill Jockey

EP

Decoration Day - 2000 - Thrill Jockey

External links 
Town and Country page at Thrill Jockey
.

American instrumental musical groups
American experimental musical groups
Musical groups from Chicago